NVC community SD1 (Rumex crispus - Glaucium flavum shingle community) is the only shingle community in the British National Vegetation Classification system.

It is a fairly widely distributed community. There are two subcommunities.

Community composition

Two constant species, Yellow Horned-poppy (Glaucium flavum) and Curled Dock (Rumex crispus), are found in this community:

One rare species, Sea-kale (Crambe maritima), is also associated with the community:

Distribution

This community is found in many localities on the south and east coasts of England, from Norfolk to Dorset, and also in scattered localities in the Isles of Scilly, Wales, northwest England and southwest Scotland.

Subcommunities

There are two subcommunities:
 the so-called typical subcommunity
 the Lathyrus japonicus subcommunity

References

 Rodwell, J. S. (2000) British Plant Communities Volume 5 - Maritime communities and vegetation of open habitats  (hardback),  (paperback)

SD01